The Thomas H. Ruth House, at 209 Poinset Ave. in DeSmet, South Dakota, was built in 1900.  It was listed on the National Register of Historic Places in 1999.

It is a two-story house located on the corner of South Dakota Highway 45 (Poinset Ave) and 3rd Street.  It was built as a single residence in 1900.  In 1929 it was remodeled and divided into apartments.

It has also been known as the Prairie House Manor Bed & Breakfast.

References

Houses on the National Register of Historic Places in South Dakota
Colonial Revival architecture in South Dakota
Houses completed in 1900
Kingsbury County, South Dakota